Carmenta tecta, the mistletoe stem borer, is a moth of the family Sesiidae. It was described by Henry Edwards in 1882. It is known from the United States, including Arizona.

Larvae are known from live oak groves with colonies of Phoradendron orbiculatum, on which the larvae feed.

References

External links
mothphotographersgroup

Sesiidae
Moths described in 1882